Cornering brake control (CBC) is an automotive safety system introduced by carmakers BMW and Mercedes-Benz (ESP Dynamic Cornering Assist and Curve Dynamic Assist). It is a further development and expansion of the anti-lock braking system, designed to distribute braking force by adjusting the brake balance during braking whilst cornering.

It works by applying braking pressure asymmetrically despite physically difficult conditions (e.g. the car swerving towards the inside of the bend when the wheel load changes). By asymmetrically distributing brake pressure to the left- and right-side brakes or by reducing pressure (to the rear axle), even if the driver brakes outside the normal range of ABS.

See also
Anti-lock braking system (ABS)
Electronic brakeforce distribution (EBD)
Electronic stability control (ESC), also known as electronic stability program (ESP)
Automobile safety
Risk compensation

References

Vehicle safety technologies